Ål Church may refer to several churches in Norway:

Ål Church (Gran), a church in Gran municipality in Innlandet county
Ål Church (Viken), a church in Ål municipality in Viken county
Nordre Ål Church (Northern Ål Church), a church in Lillehammer municipality in Innlandet county
Søre Ål Church (Southern Ål Church),  a church in Lillehammer municipality in Innlandet county